The Ambassador of the United Kingdom to Burma is the United Kingdom's chief diplomatic representative in Burma, and head of the UK's diplomatic mission. 

The government of Burma changed the name of the country to Myanmar on 18 June 1989, but the UK government has not recognised the change of name, hence the ambassador's official title is "His Majesty's Ambassador to Burma".

Ambassadors
1948–1950: James Bowker
1950–1953: Richard Speaight
1953–1956: Paul Gore-Booth
1956–1962: Sir Richard Allen
1962–1965: Sir Gordon Whitteridge
1965–1967: Leonard Wakely
1967–1970: Trafford Smith
1970–1974: Edward Willan
1974–1978: Terence O'Brien
1978–1982: Charles Booth
1982–1986: Sir Nicholas Fenn
1986–1990: Martin Morland
1990–1995: Julian Hartland-Swann
1995–1999: Robert Gordon
1999–2002: John Jenkins
2002–2006: Vicky Bowman
2006–2009: Mark Canning
2009–2013: Andrew Heyn
2013–2018: Andrew Patrick

2018–: Dan Chugg

References

External links
UK and Burma, gov.uk

Burma
 
United Kingdom